The High Sheriff of Down is the Sovereign's judicial representative in County Down. Initially an office for lifetime, assigned by the Sovereign, the High Sheriff became annually appointed from the Provisions of Oxford in 1258. Besides his judicial importance, he has ceremonial and administrative functions and executes High Court Writs.

History
The first (High) Shrivalties were established before the Norman Conquest in 1066 and date back to Saxon times. In 1908, an Order in Council made the Lord-Lieutenant the Sovereign's prime representative in a county and reduced the High Sheriff's precedence. Despite however that the office retains his responsibilities for the preservation of law and order in a county.

While the office of High Sheriff ceased to exist in those Irish counties, which had formed the Irish Free State in 1922, it is still present in the counties of Northern Ireland.

High Sheriffs

1326: John Mandeville  
1610: Richard West
1620: Nicholas Ward
1624: Nicholas Ward
1634: Henry Savage
1641: Peter Hill
1655: James Trail
1656: Bernard Ward (son of Nicholas HS 1620)
1657: Roger West (son of Richard HS 1610)
1661: Robert Ward (son of Bernard HS 1656)
1662: Nicholas Ward (son of Bernard HS 1656)
1663: John Savage
1667: Robert Ward
1669: William Waring of Waringstown
1670: William Montgomery
1675: John Hawkins of Rathfriland 
1690: Bernard Ward (killed in duel, 1690)
1699: John Haltridge

18th century

19th century

20th century

21st century

References
 

 
Down
History of County Down